Longdon is a surname. Notable people with the surname include: 

Albert Longdon (1865–1937), English cricketer
Anthony Longdon, Grenadian boxer
Darryl Longdon (born 2000), American soccer player
David Longdon (born 1965), British musician
Jennifer Longdon, American politician
Terence Longdon (1922–2011), English actor